Admiral of the Fleet Roger John Brownlow Keyes, 1st Baron Keyes,  (4 October 1872 – 26 December 1945) was a British naval officer. 

As a junior officer he served in a corvette operating from Zanzibar on slavery suppression missions. Early in the Boxer Rebellion, he led a mission to capture a flotilla of four Chinese destroyers moored to a wharf on the Peiho River. He was one of the first men to climb over the Peking walls, to break through to the besieged diplomatic legations and to free them.

During the First World War Keyes was heavily involved in the organisation of the Dardanelles Campaign. Keyes took charge in an operation when six trawlers and a cruiser attempted to clear the Kephez minefield. The operation was a failure, as the Turkish mobile artillery pieces bombarded Keyes' minesweeping squadron. He went on to be Director of Plans at the Admiralty and then took command of the Dover Patrol: he altered tactics and the Dover Patrol sank five U-Boats in the first month after implementation of Keyes' plan compared with just two in the previous two years. He also planned and led the famous raids on the German submarine pens in the Belgian ports of Zeebrugge and Ostend.

Between the wars Keyes commanded the Battlecruiser Squadron, the Atlantic Fleet and then the Mediterranean Fleet before becoming Commander-in-Chief, Portsmouth. He was elected to Parliament in 1934. During the Second World War he initially became liaison officer to Leopold III, King of the Belgians. Wearing full uniform in the House of Commons, he played an important role in the Norway Debate which led to the resignation of Neville Chamberlain as Prime Minister. He went on to be the first Director of Combined Operations and implemented plans for the training of commandos and raids on hostile coasts.

Early years
Born the second son of General Sir Charles Patton Keyes of the Indian Army and Katherine Jessie Keyes (née Norman), Keyes told his parents from an early age: "I am going to be an Admiral". After being brought up in India and then the United Kingdom, where he attended preparatory school at Margate, he joined the Royal Navy as a cadet in the training ship  on 15 July 1885. He was appointed to the cruiser , flagship of the Cape of Good Hope and West Africa Station, in August 1887. Promoted to midshipman on 15 November 1887, he transferred to the corvette , operating from Zanzibar on slavery suppression missions. Promoted to sub-lieutenant on 14 November 1891 and to lieutenant on 28 August 1893, he joined the sloop  on the Pacific Station later that year. After returning home in 1897 he became commanding officer of the destroyer  at Plymouth in January 1898.

China

Keyes was then posted out to China to command another destroyer, in September 1898, transferring to a newer ship, in January 1899. In April 1899 he went to the rescue of a small British force which was attacked and surrounded by irregular Chinese forces while attempting to demarcate the border of the Hong Kong New Territories. He went ashore, leading half the landing party, and, while HMS Fame fired on the besiegers, he led the charge which routed the Chinese and freed the troops.

In June 1900, early in the Boxer Rebellion, Keyes led a mission to capture a flotilla of four Chinese destroyers moored to a wharf on the Peiho River. Together with another junior officer, he took boarding parties onto the Chinese destroyers, captured the destroyers and secured the wharf. Shortly thereafter he led a mission to capture the heavily fortified fort at Hsi-cheng: he loaded HMS Fame with a landing party of 32 men, armed with rifles, pistols, cutlasses and explosives. His men quickly destroyed the Chinese gun mountings, blew up the powder magazine and returned to the ship.

Keyes was one of the first men to climb over the Peking walls, to break through to the besieged diplomatic legations and to free them. For this he was promoted to commander on 9 November 1900. Keyes later recalled about the sack of Beijing: "Every Chinaman ... was treated as a Boxer by the Russian and French troops, and the slaughter of men, women, and children in retaliation was revolting".

Diplomatic and submarines service
Keyes was appointed in May 1901 to the command of the destroyer  serving in the Devonport instructional flotilla. In January 1902 he was appointed in command of the destroyer , which took Bat crew and her place in the flotilla, and four months later he again brought his crew and was appointed in command of the destroyer , which served in the flotilla from May 1902. He was posted to the intelligence section at the Admiralty in 1904 and then became naval attaché at the British Embassy in Rome in January 1905. Promoted to captain on 30 June 1905, he was appointed a Member of the Royal Victorian Order on 24 April 1906. He took up command of the cruiser  in the Atlantic Fleet in 1908 before going on to be Inspecting Captain of Submarines in 1910 and, having been appointed Companion of the Order of the Bath on 19 June 1911, he became commodore of the Submarine Service in 1912. As head of the Submarine Service, he introduced an element of competition into the construction of submarines, which had previously been built by Vickers. He tended to go to sea in a destroyer because of the primitive visibility from early submarines. He became a naval aide-de-camp to the King on 15 September 1914.

First World War

When the First World War broke out, Keyes took command of the Eighth Submarine Flotilla at Harwich. He proposed, planned and took part in the first Battle of Heligoland Bight in August 1914 flying his broad pendant in the destroyer . He went alongside the sinking German cruiser  and picked up 220 survivors – including the son of Grand-Admiral Tirpitz – for which he was mentioned in dispatches.

Keyes became Chief of Staff to Vice-Admiral Sackville Carden, commander of the Royal Navy squadron off the Dardanelles, in February 1915 and was heavily involved in the organisation of the Dardanelles Campaign. After slow progress, the bombardment of the Turkish defences was called off due to low ammunition stocks and fears of a newly laid Turkish minefield. Writing to his wife, Keyes expressed frustration at the lack of imagination of his new superior, Vice-Admiral John de Robeck, arguing that "We must have a clear channel through the minefield for the ships to close to decisive range to hammer the forts and then land men to destroy the guns." Keyes took charge in an operation in March 1915 when six trawlers and the cruiser  attempted to clear the Kephez minefield. The operation was a failure, as the Turkish mobile artillery pieces bombarded Keyes' minesweeping squadron. Heavy damage was inflicted on four of the six trawlers, while HMS Amethyst was badly hit and had her steering gear damaged. After another abortive attempt to clear the mines a few days later, the naval attempt to force the straits was abandoned and instead troops were landed to assault the guns. For his service during the Dardanelles Campaign, Keyes was appointed a Companion of the Order of St Michael and St George on 1 January 1916 and awarded the Distinguished Service Order on 3 June 1916.

Keyes took command of the battleship  in the Grand Fleet in June 1916 and, having been promoted to rear-admiral on 10 April 1917, became second in command of the 4th Battle Squadron with his flag in the battleship  in June 1917. He went on to be Director of Plans at the Admiralty in October 1917 and then became Commander-in-Chief, Dover and commander of the Dover Patrol in January 1918. Prior to Keyes, the Dover Patrol had been commanded by Admiral Reginald Bacon and had succeeded in sinking two German U-Boats in the English Channel in the previous two years, but out of 88,000 crossings by ships only five had been torpedoed and one sunk by gunfire. After Keyes took control, he altered tactics, and the Dover Patrol sank five U-Boats in the first month after implementation of Keyes' plan.

In April 1918 Keyes planned and led the famous raids on the German submarine pens in the Belgian ports of Zeebrugge and Ostend. He was advanced to Commander of the Royal Victorian Order on 30 March 1918 and promoted Knight Commander of the Order of the Bath on 24 April 1918. In May 1918 he was involved in remote control trials of unmanned aerial vehicles by the Royal Navy's D.C.B. Section. He was then advanced to Knight Commander of the Royal Victorian Order on 10 December 1918 and made a baronet on 29 December 1919. In March 1919 he was appointed (Acting) Vice-Admiral in command of the Battle Cruiser Force until it was disbanded in April 1919.

Inter-war years

Keyes was given command of the new Battlecruiser Squadron hoisting his flag at Scapa Flow in the battlecruiser  in March 1919. He moved his flag to the new battlecruiser  in early 1920. Promoted to vice-admiral on 16 May 1921, he became Deputy Chief of the Naval Staff in November 1921 and then Commander-in-Chief of the Mediterranean Fleet in June 1925 with promotion to full admiral on 1 March 1926.

In January 1928 at a dance on the quarterdeck of the battleship , Rear Admiral Bernard Collard, Second-in-command of the 1st Battle Squadron, openly lambasted Royal Marine Bandmaster, Percy Barnacle, and allegedly said "I won't have a bugger like that in my ship" in the presence of ship's officers and guests. Captain Kenneth Dewar and Commander Henry Daniel accused Collard of "vindictive fault-finding" and openly humiliating and insulting them before their crew, referring to an incident involving Collard's disembarkation from the ship in March 1928 where the admiral had openly said that he was "fed up with the ship"; Collard countercharged the two with failing to follow orders and treating him "worse than a midshipman". Letters of complaint from Dewar and Daniel were passed on to Keyes. The press picked up on the story worldwide, describing the affair—with some hyperbole—as a "mutiny". Keyes was thought by the Admiralty to have handled the matter badly and this may have adversely affected his chances of becoming First Sea Lord. He became Commander-in-Chief, Portsmouth in May 1929, was promoted to Admiral of the Fleet on 8 May 1930 and was advanced Knight Grand Cross of the Order of the Bath on 3 June 1930. He then bought a house at Tingewick in Buckinghamshire and retired in May 1935.

Keyes was elected Conservative Member of Parliament for Portsmouth North in January 1934. In Parliament he fought disarmament and sought to have the Fleet Air Arm put back under the control of the navy. He was opposed to the Munich Agreement that Neville Chamberlain had reached with Adolf Hitler in 1938 and, along with Winston Churchill, was one of the few who withheld support from the Government on this issue.

Second World War

When the Second World War broke out, Keyes was very anxious to obtain active service, but at the same time criticised the Chiefs of Staff. He reached the conclusion that the regaining of Trondheim was the key to victory in Norway. He advocated the forcing of Trondheim Fjord by battleships and the landing of a military force to recapture the city. He sought an interview with Winston Churchill, then First Lord of the Admiralty, submitted an outline plan to seize the city and offered to lead the expedition. If the Admiralty did not wish to hazard newer ships, he would take in old battleships. The chiefs of staff reached similar conclusions, with the addition of subsidiary landings north at Namsos and south at Åndalsnes. However they failed to send capital ships into Trondheimsfjord. German destroyers dominated the fjord, no airfields were seized to provide air cover and troops earmarked for the centre prong were never landed. When the troops were evacuated in early May 1940 there was shock in Britain. Parliament gathered for the Norway Debate on 7 and 8 May 1940. Making a dramatic entrance in the full uniform of an Admiral of the Fleet, including medals, Keyes defended the navy and strongly criticised the government. In his closing remarks Keyes invoked Horatio Nelson.

Chamberlain's government fell two days later and Winston Churchill became prime minister.

When Germany invaded the Low Countries in May 1940, Churchill appointed Keyes liaison officer to Leopold III, King of the Belgians. But when Belgium surrendered suddenly to the Germans later that month both Leopold and Keyes were attacked in the British press.

Keyes became the first Director of Combined Operations in June 1940 and implemented plans for the training of commandos and raids on hostile coasts. He came up with bold schemes which were considered impractical by the Chiefs of Staff and he was removed from office in October 1941. He was elevated to the peerage as Baron Keyes, of Zeebrugge and of Dover in the County of Kent on 22 January 1943.

Keyes suffered a detached retina in early 1944. He then undertook a goodwill tour of Canada, Australia and New Zealand at the request of the British Government in July 1944. During his visit to the amphibious warfare ship  he suffered smoke inhalation following an attack by Japanese aircraft and never fully recovered. He died at his home in Tingewick on 26 December 1945 and was buried at the Zeebrugge corner of St James's Cemetery in Dover.

Family
In 1906 Keyes married Eva Mary Bowlby: they had three daughters and two sons including Geoffrey Keyes, who was killed in action in 1941 and was posthumously awarded the Victoria Cross.

Honours and awards
Knight Grand Cross of the Order of the Bath – 3 June 1930 (KCB – 24 April 1918, CB – 19 June 1911)
Knight Commander of the Royal Victorian Order – 10 December 1918 (CVO – 30 March 1918, MVO – 24 April 1906)
Companion of the Order of St Michael and St George – 1 January 1916
Companion of the Distinguished Service Order – 3 June 1916
Mention in Despatches – 14 March 1916
Commandeur of the Legion of Honour (France) – 5 April 1916
Navy Distinguished Service Medal (United States) – 16 September 1919
Grand Cross, Order of Leopold (Belgium) – 2 August 1921 (Grand Officer – 23 July 1918)
Croix de Guerre 1914–1918 (France) – 23 July 1918
Order of the Iron Crown, Second Class (Austria-Hungary) – 24 February 1908
Order of the Medjidieh, Second Class (Turkey) – 4 June 1908
Commander of the Order of St. Maurice and St. Lazarus (Italy) – 22 June 1908
Order of the Redeemer, Third Class (Greece) – 24 June 1909

References

Sources

Further reading

1914–1918 (1979), 
1919–1938 (1981), 
1939–1945 (1981),

External links

 
 Europeana Collections 1914–1918 makes 425,000 First World War items from European libraries available online, including The Keyes Papers

 

|-

|-

|-

|-

|-

1872 births
1945 deaths
Knights Grand Cross of the Order of the Bath
Knights Commander of the Royal Victorian Order
Companions of the Order of St Michael and St George
Companions of the Distinguished Service Order
Grand Officers of the Order of Leopold II
Commandeurs of the Légion d'honneur
Foreign recipients of the Distinguished Service Medal (United States)
Recipients of the Order of the Medjidie, 2nd class
Commanders of the Order of Saints Maurice and Lazarus
Recipients of the Croix de Guerre 1914–1918 (France)
Royal Navy admirals of the fleet
Royal Navy admirals of World War I
Royal Navy admirals of World War II
Lords of the Admiralty
Conservative Party (UK) MPs for English constituencies
UK MPs 1931–1935
UK MPs 1935–1945
UK MPs who were granted peerages
Keyes, Roger John Brownlow Keyes, 1st Baron
Recipients of the Navy Distinguished Service Medal
British naval attachés
Barons created by George VI
Royal Navy personnel killed in World War II
Military personnel of British India